The 1937 Wilmington Clippers season was their first season in existence. The team was independent and posted a 5–4 record. Their head coach was Dutch Slagle. They had Vince Lombardi on their roster in 1937.

Schedule 
The table below was compiled using the information from The Pro Football Archives. The winning teams score is listed first. If a cell is greyed out and has "N/A", then that means there is an unknown figure for that game. Green-colored rows indicate a win; yellow-colored rows indicate a tie; and red-colored rows indicate a loss.

References 

Wilmington Clippers
Wilmington Clippers
Wilmington Clippers seasons